Leonard Holland (born c. 1888) was an English professional golfer. He finished in the top-10 in the Open Championship in 1920 and 1924.

He was brought up in Caister-on-Sea, Norfolk and was later professional at Northamptonshire County Golf Club from 1911 and then, from 1924, at Gerrards Cross Golf Club.

In 1914 he won the Sphere and Tatler Foursomes Tournament in partnership with James Batley, beating the Scottish pair of C McIntosh and George Smith 5&4 in the final. His biggest individual win was in the 1925 Yorkshire Evening News Tournament. He beat James Ockenden 3&2 in the final.

Professional wins
1914 Sphere and Tatler Foursomes Tournament (with James Batley)
1925 Yorkshire Evening News Tournament
1930 West of England Professional Championship

Results in major championships

Note: Holland only played in The Open Championship.

NT = No tournament
WD = withdrew
CUT = missed the half-way cut
"T" indicates a tie for a place

References

English male golfers
People from Burgess Hill
People from Caister-on-Sea
1880s births
Year of death missing